WRVW (107.5 FM) is a radio station licensed to the city of Lebanon, Tennessee, but serving the nearby Nashville market. It is currently branded as 107.5 The River, broadcasting a Top 40 (CHR) format, and has become something of a heritage station for Top-40 music in middle Tennessee. It is owned by iHeartMedia and operates out of studios in the world-famous "Music Row" area. Its transmitter is located just north of downtown Nashville.

History

WCOR-FM/WUSW (US107)
The station signed on the air on August 31, 1962, as WCOR-FM on the 107.3 MHz frequency in Lebanon as the FM sister station to WCOR. It played a country music format for its first 19 years on the air. The station also broadcast some Southern gospel music programming in the middle and late 1970s. By 1980, it branded itself as US107 and changed its callsign to WUSW. This station proved to be short-lived; its absentee owner shut it down along with its AM sister, WCOR, in mid-1981. It was sold, moved to Nashville, and had its frequency changed to 107.5 in order to accommodate a power increase (the FCC ruled out a power increase for 107.3 because of its proximity to WQLT-FM in Florence, Alabama, which is also on 107.3).

WYHY (Y107)
The station received a complete overhaul when it moved to 107.5 FM in 1982, and went on to become one of Nashville's most successful radio stations. When the move was complete, the callsign was changed to WYHY. Those call letters and the station's official branding Y107 lasted from 1982 until 1996.

Initially under its new incarnation, Y107 broadcast adult contemporary music.  Within a few years, however, WYHY became a Top 40/CHR station, competing with two other similar stations, KX 104 FM (WWKX) and 96 Kiss FM (WZKS). Desiring a dose of attitude, craziness, and most of all fun, WYHY hired Coyote McCloud from WWKX in 1984 and launched a new morning show titled Coyote McCloud and The Y107 Morning Zoo Crew or The Y Morning Zoo for short. WYHY quickly became more aggressive in its programming approach and promoted itself as The Outrageous FM. This format, which very edgy for their time but tame by current day standards, was popular among babies kids and most importantly teens as well for its targeted demographic young adults. However, the antics of WYHY did disgust the much older yet more conservative area residents, and WYHY even became the subject of a report on CBS' 48 Hours about "shock radio". During this time, however, WYHY enjoyed enormous popularity across the board, and was regularly Nashville's highest-rated radio station.

By the early 1990s, WYHY's act wore thin as teenage tastes began changing to alternative rock, and WYHY's popularity began to decline. Ratings went down as was the case for most Top 40/CHR stations across America around that time, and WYHY no longer impressed advertisers as a result. After a brief stint with a rock-leaning Top 40/CHR format in 1993 failed to improve ratings, the station quickly reverted to mainstream contemporary hits. Around this time, the station entered a local marketing agreement with SFX Broadcasting and became a sister station to WSIX-FM. SFX eventually purchased WYHY outright and made some wholesale changes to the station. The "Outrageous FM" era was over as the station again took a more straight forward approach to make it more palatable to advertisers. Despite the changes, the Y107 branding still carried a negative connotation among local businesses due to the sheer number of crazy stunts that WYHY pulled in order to get publicity earlier in its life. WYHY also had its lowest ratings in over 10 years during the mid-1990s. Additionally, Coyote and most of the Y107 airstaff, as well their mascot the Tookie Bird, left the station in early 1995. These factors led management to completely overhaul and rebrand the station.

WRVW (107.5 The River)
On February 15, 1996, at 3 p.m., air personality Gator Harrison was joined in the studio by pop artist Lisa Loeb, and the station changed its branding to "107.5 The River", and its format to Hot Adult Contemporary. A few days later, the callsign changed to WRVW. Over the next few years, however, the station's format gradually returned to Top 40. The station, to this day, still promotes itself as "The River". After a series of ownership changes, WRVW was acquired by Clear Channel Communications (now iHeartMedia). The station's flagship show is Woody and Jim in the Morning, hosted by Woody Wood and Jim Chandler, who previously worked together at stations in Albany, New York, and San Diego.  The staff had been remarkably consistent through the Rich Davis era but changed after his departure.  Rich Davis, who joined from WZEE in Madison in 2000, was the operations manager/program director until late 2011.  "Madison" (who voice-tracks from WQEN) now handles 1–3 p.m., but has been with the station since 2004 and tracked the whole midday show until mid-2008.  Ryan Seacrest's show joined the lineup in August 2008, weekdays from 12–3 p.m. but added an extra hour in June 2009 and now runs 9 a.m.–1 p.m.  "Ryno" holds down afternoons and has done so since early 2003.  "Butter" – famous for his "What's Down Butter's Britches" game, has been with the station on and off for years, but was the full-time night jock and music director from 2004 until late March 2012.  Program director Brian Mack was made Rich Davis's replacement in spring 2012. "Scooter" and "Lunchbox" worked mostly on weekends.

HD Radio
WRVW broadcasts in the HD format: 
HD 1 is "The River"
HD 2 is "Silent"
From 2009 until January 1, 2020, WRVW broadcast an HD2 signal. It first began under the branding "Future Radio" until 2012, when the name changed to "Hit Nation Radio". The HD2 signal was discontinued temporarily on January 1, 2020, because of budget constraints at owner iHeartMedia. In mid-2020, WRVW's iHeart sister WLAC began simulcasting on the HD2 signal. In late November 2022, WRVW stopped simulcasting WLAC on the HD2 signal and changed the format to 24/7 Christmas music. It was noticed on January 1, 2023, that the HD2 signal had been taken off the air again.

Former DJs/staff
The Y107 Tookie Bird (CEO/Founder/Mascot)
Mike Kenney (General Manager)
Dan Swensson (LSM/GM)
Coyote McCloud (1942–2011) Morning Zoo
Rhett Walker (Gary Burleigh/Morning Zoo, now retired, lives in Seattle)
Marc Chase (PD/OM/Morning Zoo)
Tony Galluzzo (Operations Manager)
Louis Kaplan (PD/Music Director)
Cameron Adkins (Chief Engineer)
Bumper Morgan (Production Director/Imaging/Promos)
Kim Greco (Traffic Director)
Margaret Pennington (Business Manager)
Dana "Do-Right" Knight (Zoo Crew Morning Show Producer, On-Air Talent)
Teresa Birdsong (Promotions Director)
Missy Whitaker (Promotions Director)
Tom Peace (left broadcasting profession)
J. Karen Thomas (Middays) became an actress, died in 2015
Hollywood Hendrix (Nights),(Mid-days/Production Director) now working at iHeart Media, Nashville, TN
Christopher Holmes (Middays)
Billy Breeze (Afternoons)
Gary Jeff Walker (Afternoons)
Downtown Billy Brown (Afternoons)
Eric Page (Nights)
Dianna Lynn (Overnights)
Spyderman (Overnights)
Tim & Tom (Overnights)
Hawk Harrison (Overnights)
Rick O'Shay (Cam Cornelius)
Deacon Dave "The Breakfast Slave" (Dave Park/WTVF Helicopter Traffic Reporter)
Buck Nayked (Y-107 Traffic)
Gator Harrison (Tony Hawkins)
John "Rock 'n Roll" Smelly (Weekends)
Dale Doe (Weekends)
Jimmy B. (Weekends)
Booger
Mary "Proud Mary" Lassiter (Also worked with Sister Station WNRQ, now retired, lives in Louisville)
Blair Saldana "Producer Blair" (Mornings)
Brian Mack (PD)(now PD WXXL Orlando)
Jet Black (Nights, APD/MD) (left radio in 2015)
Chris Mann (Nights)
Billy Breeze
Boomer the Love Broker (Nights) (Now OM for Cumulus Indianapolis and PD WFMS)
Temple Hancock (Swing)(Now at Sirius/XM)
Dylan (nights/prod 1998)
Bryan(Keith)Palmer
Wes McCain
Rich Davis (OM/PD '00 -'11)(now OM iHeart Media Minneapolis, PD KDWB)
Butter (MD/Nights)(now afternoons WJXA Nashville)
Lunchbox 
Chris Chicago
Ashlee Fox
KC Holiday
Derry London
Jack Evans (OM/PD)
Kris Earl Phillips (OM/PD)
Michael St. John
Cruz (nights)
Intern Adam Davis (morning co-host, nights summer of 2012)
Marc Murphee (morning co-host with Proud Mary 1998-1999)

References

External links

The Y107 Museum 
 - MP3 file

RVW
RVW
IHeartMedia radio stations
Lebanon, Tennessee
Radio stations established in 1962
Contemporary hit radio stations in the United States
1962 establishments in Tennessee